"Dance Commander" is a song by American rock band Electric Six. It was released as the third single from their debut studio album Fire on October 13, 2003, but only in the United Kingdom. The song peaked at number 40 on the UK Singles Chart.

Music video
The song's music video, directed by Ruben Fleischer, features a slightly different mix of the song. It received significant airplay on MTV. The video features scenes of the band's frontman Dick Valentine dancing erratically around a house.

Track listing

12" vinyl
 XL — XLT 170

CD1
 XL — XLS 170 CD

CD2
 XL — XLS 170 CD2

Charts

Legacy
 The band performed the song on their first live album "Absolute Pleasure".
 The band performed the song in their live concert movie "Absolute Treasure".

Release history

References

2003 singles
2003 songs
Electric Six songs
Music videos directed by Ruben Fleischer